Aiko Climaco (born 6 August 1989) is a Filipino actress, model and comedian. She was formerly known as a member of ASF dancer for Wowowee. She was a member for Banana Split Girls with former SexBomb Sunshine Garcia and Jef Gaitan, which featured in January 2014 issue of FHM Philippines, and being solo for February 2015. She also dubbed with volleyball superstar Rachel Anne Daquis as the Sexiest Twin Towers, which finally join with each other at the FHM BroCon (FHM 100 Sexiest Woman Party). Climaco with Myrtle Sarrosa led a newly formed girl group named Star Magic Angels.

Filmography

Television

Music video appearance
 Shopping (Ryan Bang feat. Donnalyn Bartolome, 2015 also with Yam Concepcion, James Reid and Jayson Gainza)

Awards and recognition

FHM 100 Sexiest Woman

References

External links
 

1989 births
Living people
Filipina gravure idols
Star Magic
Filipino female models
People from Quezon City
Actresses from Metro Manila
People from Zamboanga City